Les Courtilles is the terminus of the northwestern branch of Line 13 of the Paris Métro.

Location
The station is located on the border of the municipalities of communes of Asnières-sur-Seine and Gennevilliers, at the intersection formed by the axis of the Avenue de la Redoute and Avenue Lucien-Lanternier on the one hand, and the axis Boulevard Pierre-de-Coubertin and Boulevard Intercommunal on the other hand. The name of each of these two towns can be found above the name of the station on the maps and in the station.

History
The station opened on 14 June 2008 upon completion of the extension of Line 13 from Gabriel Péri. Reversing sidings are provided to the north of the station for trains to change direction. In November 2012, Île-de-France tramway Line 1 was extended to the west to terminate at Les Courtilles.

In 2020, with the Covid-19 crisis, 2,194,218 passengers entered this station, which places it in 109th position among metro stations for its attendance.

A later extension of line 13 to Port de Gennevilliers, included in the Schéma directeur de la région Île-de-France (SDRIF) master plan and adopted in 2008 by the Regional Council of Île-de-France, is no longer envisaged. This project no longer appears in the new version of the SDRIF adopted on 25 October 2012.

Passenger services

Station layout

Platforms
Les Courtilles is a standard configuration station with two platforms separated by metro tracks.

Other connections
The station is served by the T1 tramway (since 15 November 2012), lines 235, 238, 276, 304, 378 and Bus du Port of the RATP Bus Network, and at night, by the Noctilien line N51.

Nearby
 Port of Gennevilliers
 Stade Léo-Lagrange, in Asnières-sur-Seine

Gallery

See also
 List of stations of the Paris Métro

Notes

References
Roland, Gérard (2003). Stations de métro. D’Abbesses à Wagram. Éditions Bonneton.

Paris Métro stations in Asnières-sur-Seine
Paris Métro stations in Gennevilliers
Railway stations in France opened in 2008